Algarinejo is a city located in the province of Granada, Spain. According to the 2005 census (INE), the city had a population of 4184 inhabitants. The city is located by the Pesquería River.

The name "Algarinejo" presumably originates from the arabic word "al-gar", meaning "the cave".

References

Municipalities in the Province of Granada